Palm Beach is a settlement on Waiheke Island in northern New Zealand. The eponymous beach is named for phoenix palms at the eastern end, and has safe swimming and white sand.

Demographics

Oneroa East-Palm Beach had a population of 1,254 at the 2018 New Zealand census, an increase of 75 people (6.4%) since the 2013 census, and an increase of 117 people (10.3%) since the 2006 census. There were 513 households, comprising 612 males and 642 females, giving a sex ratio of 0.95 males per female. The median age was 47.0 years (compared with 37.4 years nationally), with 192 people (15.3%) aged under 15 years, 171 (13.6%) aged 15 to 29, 600 (47.8%) aged 30 to 64, and 288 (23.0%) aged 65 or older.

Ethnicities were 90.7% European/Pākehā, 10.8% Māori, 4.1% Pacific peoples, 3.1% Asian, and 3.8% other ethnicities. People may identify with more than one ethnicity.

The percentage of people born overseas was 31.1, compared with 27.1% nationally.

Although some people chose not to answer the census's question about religious affiliation, 60.8% had no religion, 24.6% were Christian, 1.4% had Māori religious beliefs, 0.7% were Hindu, 0.5% were Muslim, 0.7% were Buddhist and 5.0% had other religions.

Of those at least 15 years old, 384 (36.2%) people had a bachelor's or higher degree, and 102 (9.6%) people had no formal qualifications. The median income was $33,700, compared with $31,800 nationally. 261 people (24.6%) earned over $70,000 compared to 17.2% nationally. The employment status of those at least 15 was that 477 (44.9%) people were employed full-time, 189 (17.8%) were part-time, and 18 (1.7%) were unemployed.

Gallery

References

Beaches of the Auckland Region
Populated places on Waiheke Island